Sułkowo  (German: Friedrichsruh) is a village in the administrative district of Gmina Radowo Małe, within Łobez County, West Pomeranian Voivodeship, in north-western Poland. 

References

Villages in Łobez County